The Ray Allen Billington Prize is given biennially by the Organization of American Historians (OAH) for the best book about American frontier history. The "American frontier" includes all of North and South America, all post-1492 pioneer experiences, and comparisons between American frontiers and others around the world.  First given in 1981, this prize honors Ray Allen Billington, OAH President (1962-1963) and prolific writer about American frontiers. A three-member committee, chosen by the OAH President for a two-year term, selects the winner who receives $1000.  The first award was made posthumously to John D. Unruh who died in 1976.  No award was made in 1997, and two awards were made in 1999.

The following table lists past recipients.

See also

 List of history awards

References

External links

 List of prize winners

American literary awards
Awards established in 1981
History awards
History books about the United States
Colonization history of the United States